The viola is a stringed musical instrument related to the violin.
Viola also may refer to:

Guitars
Viola is a term for several Portuguese and Brazilian regional folk guitars, frequently called simply "viola" in their respective regions:
Portugal:
Viola Amarantina, a 5-course, 10-string guitar
Viola Beiroa, a small harp guitar with twelve strings
Viola braguesa, a 5-course, 10-string guitar
Viola da terra, a 5-course, 12- or 15-string guitar
Viola de arame, a 5-course, 9-string guitar from Madeira
Viola Terceira, a 6-course, 15-string guitar from the Azores
Viola Toeira, a 5-course, 12-string guitar
Brazil:
Viola caipira, a 5-course, 10-string Brazilian guitar
Viola de cocho a 5-course, 5-string Brazilian guitar
Viola sertaneja, a 5-course, 10-string Brazilian guitar

Organisms
Viola (butterfly), a genus of skipper butterflies
Viola (plant), a genus of flowering plants, including violets and pansies

Places

United States
Viola, Arkansas, a town
Viola, California, an unincorporated community
Viola, Delaware, a town
Viola, Georgia, an unincorporated community
Viola, Idaho, an unincorporated community
Viola, Illinois, a village
Viola, Iowa, an unincorporated community
Viola, Kansas, a city
Viola, Kentucky, an unincorporated community
Viola, Minnesota, an unincorporated community
Viola, Missouri, an unincorporated community
Viola, New York, a hamlet
Viola, Tennessee, a town
Viola, Marion County, West Virginia, an unincorporated community
Viola, Marshall County, West Virginia, an unincorporated community
Viola, Wisconsin, a village
Viola Township (disambiguation), various townships
Lake Viola (Florida), a lake in Highlands County, Florida

Italy
Viola, Piedmont, a comune in the province of Cuneo
Lago Viola, a small lake in Lombardy

People
Viola (given name), a female given name, including a list of people and fictional characters with the name
Viola (surname)
Viola (singer) (born 1976), stage name of Italian singer Violante Placido
Viola (footballer) (born 1969), Brazilian footballer Paulo Sergio Rosa
Viola, pen name of American poet Laura M. Hawley Thurston (1812-1842)
Paulinho da Viola, Brazilian musician born Paulo César Batista de Faria in 1942

Military 

 Viola (trawler), an English steam trawler built in 1906
 HMS Viola, an Aubrietia-class sloop launched in 1916
 Viola, the original name of  HMS Legion (1914) a Laforey-class destroyer, laid down in 1912

Other uses
Typhoon Viola, various typhoons, a tropical storm and a tropical depression
Viola (opera), an unfinished opera by Bedřich Smetana
1076 Viola, an asteroid
Viol@, a 1998 Italian erotic drama film
Viola Reggio Calabria, an Italian basketball team
ViolaWWW, an American web browser
I Viola, a nickname of the Italian football club ACF Fiorentina
Viola–Jones object detection framework
Berimbau viola, the smallest berimbau in the berimbau ensembles

See also
Viol, a family of stringed musical instruments
Viola da Gamba, another name for the viol
Violin (disambiguation)
Voila (disambiguation)
Violet (disambiguation)
Violeta (disambiguation)
Violetta (disambiguation)
Violette (disambiguation)